The Grove Street is a surface-level light rail stop in the Silver Lake section of Bloomfield, Essex County, New Jersey. The station is the western terminus of the Newark City Subway section of the New Jersey Transit Newark Light Rail that heads to Penn Station in Newark. The vehicle maintenance facility is east of the station. Grove Street is a single island platform station with two tracks and is accessible for handicapped people as part of the Americans with Disabilities Act of 1990. A 160-space park and ride lot is located one block from the station, after the loop track for the maintenance facility. Grove Street is also near the Watsessing Avenue station of New Jersey Transit's Montclair-Boonton Line.

Grove Street station opened on June 22, 2002, part of an extension from Branch Brook Park station in Newark to Bloomfield, with a middle stop at Silver Lake in Belleville. The tracks however follow the right-of-way of the former Erie Railroad Orange Branch, which went from the Forest Hill section of Newark to West Orange. The former Bloomfield Avenue station was located one block west of the current Grove Street station. Service on that branch ended on May 20, 1955.

Transfers
New Jersey Transit buses: 11, 28, 29, 72, 90 NOTE: All buses except for the 90 stop on Bloomfield Avenue.

References

Newark Light Rail stations
Bloomfield, New Jersey
Railway stations in the United States opened in 2002
Railway stations in Essex County, New Jersey
2002 establishments in New Jersey